Rima Valentienė (born June 10, 1978) is a Lithuanian professional basketball player. 

Valentienė plays for Kauno VIČI-Aistės and Lithuania women's national basketball team. She has represented the Lithuanian national team in several EuroBasket Women competitions. Valentienė has spent her entire career playing in Lithuania, except during the 2009-2010 season when she played for the Latvian team SK Cesis.

References

External links 
 FIBA Europe profile
 Basketnews 

1978 births
Living people
Lithuanian women's basketball players
People from Ukmergė
Point guards